Perfectly Normal is a Canadian comedy film directed by Yves Simoneau, which premiered at the 1990 Festival of Festivals, before going into general theatrical release in 1991. Simoneau's first English-language film, it was written by Eugene Lipinski and Paul Quarrington.

The film stars Michael Riley as Renzo Parachi, a mild-mannered man living in the small town of Long Bay, Ontario, whose quiet, unassuming life working at the local brewery and playing hockey for the company team is transformed when Alonzo Turner (Robbie Coltrane) comes to town, ingratiating himself as Renzo's new roommate and convincing him to invest in an Italian restaurant where the servers will sing "Bellini's Norma".

The film received four Genie Award nominations at the 12th Genie Awards in 1991: Best Picture, Best Original Screenplay (Lipinski and Quarrington), Best Art Direction and Production Design (Anne Pritchard) and Best Editing (Ronald Sanders). Lipinski and Quarrington won the award for Best Original Screenplay.

Cast
Robbie Coltrane  as Alonzo Turner
Michael Riley  as Renzo Parachi
Deborah Duchene  as Denise
Eugene Lipinski  as Hopeless
Kenneth Welsh  as Charlie Glesby
Patricia Gage  as Mrs. Hathaway
J.D. Nicholsen  as Duane Bickle (as Jack Nichols)
Elizabeth Harpur  as Gloria
Kristina Nicoll  as Tiffany
Peter Millard  as Bunden
Bryan Foster  as Gig Manyon
Andrew Miller  as Pizza Guy
Warren Van Evera  as Old Man
Douglas C. Frye  as Boy in Cab
Graham Harley  as Middle-aged Man
Ellen-Ray Hennessy  as Clairvoyant
Gene Dinovi  as Priest
Gino Marrocco  as Uncle Thomas
Roc LaFortune  as St. John's Ambulance Man

References

External links

1990 films
English-language Canadian films
Canadian comedy films
1990 comedy films
Films directed by Yves Simoneau
Films set in Ontario
1990s English-language films
1990s Canadian films